Central Medford High School (formerly Medford Opportunity High School) is a public alternative high school in Medford, Oregon, United States. In 2010 the school moved from its original location on Earhart Street to a new location on Oakdale Avenue in Medford.  It occupied part of the old South Medford High School (which is now located on Cunningham Avenue in Medford). In 2020 the school relocated to its current location on Royal Avenue in Medford, occupying the previous location of Grace Christian campus.

History 
John Kasich, 2016 Republican presidential candidate and Governor of Ohio, hosted a campaign event at the school on April 28, 2016.

Academics
In 2008, 4% of the school's seniors received a high school diploma. Of 184 students, seven graduated, 148 dropped out, and 29 were still in high school the following year.

References

High schools in Jackson County, Oregon
Alternative schools in Oregon
Education in Medford, Oregon
Public high schools in Oregon
Historic district contributing properties in Oregon
National Register of Historic Places in Jackson County, Oregon
School buildings on the National Register of Historic Places in Oregon